Lia Pernell (born August 16, 1981) is an American rower. She was born in Berkeley, California. She competed at the 2008 Summer Olympics in Beijing, where she placed fifth in quadruple sculls, together with Lindsay Meyer, Jennifer Kaido and Margot Shumway.

See also
List of Princeton University Olympians

References

External links

1981 births
Living people
Sportspeople from Berkeley, California
American female rowers
Olympic rowers of the United States
Rowers at the 2008 Summer Olympics
21st-century American women